Roberta Kalechofsky (born May 11, 1931 – April 5, 2022) was an American writer, feminist and animal rights activist, focusing on the issue of animal rights within Judaism and the promotion of vegetarianism within the Jewish community. She was the founder of Jews for Animal Rights and Micah Publications or Micah Books, which specializes in the publication of animal rights, Jewish vegetarian, and Holocaust literature.

Biography

Kalechofsky was born in Brooklyn and attended Brooklyn College, receiving her B.A. in 1952, followed by an M.A. in English literature from New York University in 1956, and a Ph.D. from the same university in 1970, also in English literature. She taught at the University of Connecticut and Brooklyn College.

Kalechofsky was married to Robert Kalechofsky until his death in December 2020, a retired mathematics professor from Salem State University who was also a vegetarian. They appeared together representing Micah Books at publisher, writer, vegetarian, and animal advocacy events around North America, including the Boston Vegetarian Society's annual Boston Vegetarian Food Festival. Their two sons each have earned doctorates.

Career

Kalechofsky was the author of Animal Suffering and the Holocaust: The Problem with Comparisons (2003), as well as poetry, seven works of illustrative fiction, two collections of essays, and a monograph on George Orwell. Micah Publications, which Kalechofsky founded in 1975, has published two haggadot for a vegetarian seder, one of which, Haggadah for the Liberated Lamb, has been exhibited at Harvard University in an exhibit on food and politics, and at the Jewish Museum in New York.

Philosopher Tom Regan has said of Kalechofsky, "[o]f all the historians of ideas with whom I am familiar, if I had a choice between listening to just one of them, I would not hesitate to choose Roberta. She is that good, that worth spending time with."

Jews for Animal Rights (JAR)

Kalechofsky founded Jews for Animal Rights (JAR) in 1985 with the aim of upholding and spread the Talmudic prohibition against causing suffering to living creatures, known as tza'ar ba'alei hayyim. The group promotes the ideas of Rabbi Abraham Kook on vegetarianism, and campaigns to find alternatives to animal testing.

She was a member of PETA, but has been critical of their "Holocaust On Your Plate", linking the consumption of animals to the Holocaust.

Selected publications

Autobiography of A Revolutionary: Essays on My Life as an Animal Rights Activist (1991)
Judaism and Animal Rights: Classical and Contemporary Responses (1992)
Haggadah for the Vegetarian Family (1993)
Journey of the Liberated Lamb: Reflections for a Vegetarian Seder (1994)
Rabbis and Vegetarianism: An Evolving Tradition (1996)
The Jewish Vegetarian Year Cookbook (1997)
Vegetarian Judaism: A Guide for Everyone (1998)
Animal Suffering and the Holocaust: The Problem With Comparisons (2003)
The Vegetarian Shabbat Cookbook (2010)

See also
Animals and the environment in Jewish ethics
Animal cruelty and the Holocaust analogy
List of animal rights advocates
Jewish vegetarianism

References

Further reading
"The Evolution of An Independent Publisher," Judaica Book News, 1983
Berry, Rynn "Hitler: Neither Vegetarian Nor Animal Lover", 2004, 
Cohen, Noah J. Tsa'ar ba'ale hayim: The prevention of cruelty to animals: its bases, development, and legislation in Hebrew literature, New York: Feldheim, 1979. 
Kaganoff, P. "An Independent Woman of Words," The Jewish Monthly, 1988
Kalechofsky, R. Animal Suffering and the Holocaust: The Problem with Comparisons, 2003. 
Kalechofksy, R. (ed.) Judaism and Animal Rights: Classical and Contemporary Responses, a collection of 41 articles by rabbis, doctors, veterinarians, and philosophers on animal rights and Judaism, 1992. 
Kalechofksy, R. Vegetarian Judaism: A Guide for Everyone, 1998. 
Patterson, C. Eternal Treblinka: Our Treatment of Animals and the Holocaust, 2002. 
Schwartz, R. The Schwartz Collection on Judaism, Vegetarianism, and Animal Rights.
Walden, D. (ed.) "American Jewish Writers, Dictionary of Literary Biographies, vol 28, 1984.

External links

Kalechofsky, Roberta. Book Review by Urrutia of "A Boy, a Chicken, and the Lion of Judah: How Ari became a Vegetarian".
Jewish Vegetarians of North America
Guide to the Roberta Kalechofsky Papers 1896-2009

1931 births
20th-century American women writers
21st-century American Jews
21st-century American women
American animal rights activists
American feminists
American vegetarianism activists
American women academics
Brookline, Massachusetts
Brooklyn College alumni
Brooklyn College faculty
Jewish American writers
Jewish feminists
Jewish vegetarianism
New York University alumni
People from Boston
University of Connecticut faculty
Vegetarian cookbook writers